Patricia Margaret Bell (née Simpson, 8 April 1931 – 3 August 2005) professionally known as Paddie Bell, was a Scottish folk singer and musician, born in Northern Ireland.

Biography 
Bell was born as Patricia Margaret Simpson, in Belfast, Northern Ireland, but was a resident of Edinburgh, Scotland for most of her life. She sang with The Corrie Folk Trio from 1962 to 1965. The band later became The Corries after she left because she wanted to perform different songs from the ones the Trio sang. She pursued a solo career after this, releasing an album called Herself.

She returned to the Scottish folk scene in the 1990s, recorded two CDs, was a regular at Edinburgh Folk Club and had her own celebrated show in the Edinburgh Festival, as well as appearing at Festival Folk at the Oak.

She married architect Sandy Bell of Blairgowrie in 1957 and had a daughter Morven in 1966, an oboist and woodwind teacher.

Solo albums
1965 – Herself (with Martin Carthy)
1968 – I Know Where I'm Going (with Finbar and Eddie Furey)
1993 – The Dawn of a Brand New Day
1997 – Make me Want to Stay
1998 – An Irish Kiss

References

External links
Corrie Folk Trio
Paddie Bell

1931 births
2005 deaths
Musicians from Belfast
Scottish folk musicians
Scottish folk singers
Folk musicians from Northern Ireland
Musicians from Edinburgh
Folk singers from Northern Ireland
20th-century Scottish women singers
20th-century Scottish musicians